is a city located in Iwate Prefecture, Japan. , the city had an estimated population of 51,150, and a population density of 41 persons per km2.

Geography
Miyako is located in central Iwate Prefecture, bordered by the Pacific Ocean to the east, with the main urban area fronting on Miyako Bay. It is located at the northern end of the rias coastal area of the Sanriku Coast, east of the prefectural capital of Morioka. The city area is the largest in Iwate Prefecture and the second largest in the Tōhoku region (after Tsuruoka, Yamagata). However, around 90% of the city area is covered by mountains and forest, so the habitable area is only about 9% of the total area, and therefore although the population density per total area is low, but the population density per habitable area exceeds the prefecture average. Miyako is connected to Morioka by an east–west train line and highway and the coastal highway also goes through the town. The city has a small port but much of the shipping traffic is taken by larger cities along the coast. Parts of the coastal area of the city are within the borders of the Sanriku Fukkō National Park, and part of the mountainous interior is within Hayachine Quasi-National Park.

Neighboring municipalities
Iwate Prefecture
Morioka
Hanamaki
Tōno
Iwaizumi
Yamada
Ōtsuchi

Climate
Miyako straddles between a humid subtropical climate (Köppen climate classification Cfa) and an oceanic climate (Cfb), characterized by mild summers and cold winters.  The average annual temperature in Miyako is 10.9 °C. The average annual rainfall is 1282 mm with September as the wettest month and February as the driest month. The temperatures are highest on average in August, at around 22.9 °C, and lowest in January, at around 0.2 °C.

Demographics
Per Japanese census data, the population of Miyako peaked in around the year 1960 and has declined steadily over the past 60 years.

History
The area of present-day Miyako was part of ancient Mutsu Province, and has been settled since at least the Jōmon period. The area was inhabited by the Emishi people, and came under the control of the Yamato dynasty during the early Heian period with the construction a fortified settlement on the coast. During the Muromachi period, the area came under the control of the Nambu clan, and was the main seaport for Morioka Domain during the Edo period under the Tokugawa shogunate. 

On 27 January 1700, the coast of Miyako was hit by a  tsunami that was a product of the 1700 Cascadia earthquake, destroying 20 homes. The record from Miyako helped provide an exact date for the earthquake.

During the Boshin War of the Meiji restoration, the Battle of Miyako Bay was one of the major naval engagements of the war.

Under the Meiji period establishment of the modern municipalities system, the towns of Miyako and Kuwagasaki were established within Higashihei District. The area was devastated by a  tsunami in 1896, which killed 1,859 inhabitants. Higashihei District became part of Shimohei District on 1 April 1897. Miyako and Kuwagasaki merged on 1 April 1924. On 3 March 1933, much of the town was destroyed by the 1933 Sanriku earthquake, which killed 911 people and destroyed over 98% of the buildings in the town. Miyako attained city status on 20 June 1940.

On 6 June 2005, Miyako absorbed the town of Tarō, and village of Niisato, more than doubling the old city's size. On 1 January 2010, Miyako absorbed the village of Kawai (also from Shimohei District).

2011 Tōhoku earthquake and tsunami 
On 11 March 2011, Miyako was devastated by a tsunami caused by the 2011 Tōhoku earthquake. Only about 30–60 boats survived from the town's 960 ship fishing fleet. The final reported death toll from the disaster was 420 confirmed dead, 92 missing, and 4,005 buildings destroyed.

Some of the most iconic footage of the tsunami, repeatedly broadcast worldwide, was shot in Miyako. It shows a dark black wave cresting and overflowing a floodwall and tossing cars, followed by a fishing ship capsizing as it hit the submerged floodwall and then crushed as it was forced beneath a bridge.

Government

Miyako has a mayor-council form of government with a directly elected mayor and a unicameral city legislature of 28 members. Miyako, together with the town of Iwaizumi and the villages of Fudai, Tanohata, and Yamada, collectively contributes three seats to the Iwate Prefectural legislature. In terms of national politics, the village is part of Iwate 2nd district of the lower house of the Diet of Japan.

Economy
The local economy of Miyako is based heavily on commercial fishing and food processing.

Education

Colleges
Miyako Junior College

Primary and secondary education
Miyako has 21 public elementary schools and 11 public junior high schools operated by the city government. The city has five public high schools operated by the Iwate Prefectural Board of Education and one private high school. Iwate Prefecture also operates one special education school for the handicapped.

Transportation

Railway
East Japan Railway Company (JR East) -  Yamada Line
  -  -  -  -  -  -  -  -  -  -  -  
Sanriku Railway – Rias Line
 -   -  -  -  -  -  -  -  -

Highway

Port
Port of Miyako

Local attractions
Jōdogahama, National Place of Scenic Beauty
Sanriku Fukkō National Park
Cape Todo
Mount Hayachine, one of the 100 Famous Japanese Mountains
Sakiyama Shell Mound, a Jōmon-period National Historic Site

International relations
 Yantai, Shandong province, China  friendship city since April 1, 1966
 Benguet, Philippines, friendship city since August 7, 1992

Noted people from Miyako
Nobutoshi Hikage, judoka
Toshio Fujiwara, kick-boxer
Tokuichiro Tamazawa, politician

In popular media
Miyako was a filming location for Times of Joy and Sorrow starring Hideko Takamine and Keiji Sada in 1957.

References

External links

Official Website 

 
Cities in Iwate Prefecture
Populated coastal places in Japan
Port settlements in Japan